Shankar–Ehsaan–Loy Inspiration: Aman Ki Aasha tour is the first world tour by Indian musical trio Shankar–Ehsaan–Loy. The tour started off on July 17, at the Izod Center in New Jersey. Gunjan Lamba is the choreographer of the tour. The tour features major singers from India and Pakistan, like Mahalaxmi Iyer, Shafqat Amanat Ali, Richa Sharma, Raman Mahadevan and Anusha Mani.

Tour dates

Reception
The tour was a huge success and garnered extremely positive reviews from the blogosphere. Kishore Vikaas of MTV Iggy in his review, said that hundreds from Pennsylvania, New Jersey, New York and beyond were already lining up for the show and summed up, "Wear comfortable shoes because it’s inevitable that you’ll end up dancing in the aisles at some point". Another blogger, Richa, called it an amazing experience to remember  while Preeti of Rants & Revelations described it as A wonderful evening and remarked that Shankar Mahadevan stole the show.

References

External links
 List of Venues and Dates
 Event posters, info, tickets and dates

2010 concert tours
India–Pakistan relations